Hokkien is one of the largest Chinese language groups worldwide. Profanity in Hokkien most commonly involves sexual references and scorn of the object's ancestors, especially their mother. The mentioning of sexual organs is frequently used in Hokkien profanity.

Insults 

As in English, a vulgar word for the sexual act fuck is used in insults and expletives. Below are the most commonly used Hokkien vulgar words.

Most frequently used F-word

kàn (姦) - fuck. Expressions:
"kàn lín lāu-bú chhàu chi-bai" (姦恁老母臭膣屄); often abbreviated to "kàn lín lāu-bú" or simply "kàn lín niâ" (姦恁娘) - the most notoriously popular Hokkien expletive meaning "fuck your mother's smelly vagina (Cunt can also be substituted in this.)".
"sio kàn" (相姦) - to fuck
"tio̍h kàn" (著姦)- to get fucked 
"hiong kàn/hong kàn" (鄉姦) - expression used in anger, meaning "go get fucked!"
chi-bai (膣屄) - vagina; cunt
chhàu chi-bai (臭膣屄)- smelly vagina
poah (撥) - to fuck or fucking.  
kàn lín lāu-bú poah chi-bai" "姦恁老母撥膣屄 - Fuck your mother's fucking vagina (Cunt can be substituted)
ni, leng (奶)- breast

Kan

Kan, literally meaning fuck, is the most common but grossly vulgar profanity in Hokkien. It is considered to be the national swear word in Taiwan, Malaysia, and Singapore. Used in a manner similar to the English word fuck, kan can express dismay, disgrace, and disapproval. It is extremely offensive when used to insult someone. 

Variety of phrases associated with Kan:

 kàn lín-niâ = fuck your mother
 kàn lín lāu-bú = fuck your mother
 kàn lín lāu-bú chhàu chi-bai  = fuck your mother's smelly vagina
 kàn lín chó͘-má = fuck your great grandmother
 kàn lín lāu-su = fuck your teacher
 kàn lín-niâ chi-bai = fuck your mother's vagina
 kàn lín-niâ chhàu chi-bai = fuck your mother's smelly vagina
 kàn lín lāu-bú poah chi-bai = fuck your mother's broken vagina, literally means "fuck your mother broken vagina"  
 kàn lín-niâ-bú chhàu chi-bai =  fuck your mother's smelly vagina. In Singapore, niâ-bú 娘母 (mother) also exists in other variants of pronunciation such as nâ-bú (a vowel change from niâ to nâ when spoken quickly), nâ-beh.
 kàn lí chin-sóng() = literally means "it's cool to rape/fuck you"
 kàn kah ē khan-si = literally means "fucking you until it becomes wet". Describing that vagina will become wet and intertwined like a spider web during sexual intercourse
 lín-niâ,  lín-niâ--leh or lín-niâ khah-hó = short form for kàn lín-niâ, meaning "fuck your mother". 
 sio-kàn = means having sex, fucking each other, to fuck
 tio̍h kàn = to get fucked
 hiông-kàn = expression used in anger, meaning "go get fucked!"
 khí-kàn = start scolding someone in vulgarity, start swearing
 kàn kha-tshng = sodomy, anal or oral sex
 káu-kàn-tūi() = to curse someone being fucked/raped by a dog
 hō͘-káu-kàn-kàn leh = to curse someone to be fucked by a dog

Most frequently used sexual organ

chi-bai (膣屄) - vagina; cunt
chhàu chi-bai (臭膣屄)- smelly vagina
poah (撥) - to fuck or fucking.  
ni, leng (奶)- breast

C-word (Cock)
lān-jiáu (𡳞鳥) - penis; also used as an expression to indicate incredulity, as in the English "Bullshit!". Expressions:
koài-lān (怪𡳞) - literally 'weird penis', used to call somebody fucked up or abnormal.
kóng lān-chiáu oe (講𡳞鳥話) - to talk rubbish
khoàⁿ siáⁿ-mih lān-chiáu? (看啥物𡳞鳥) - "What the hell are you looking at?"
lām-pha (𡳞脬)- scrotum; also used as an expression to indicate incredulity, as in the English "Bollocks!" Nasal assimilation takes place as the onset of the second syllable is a bilabial, turning the underlying form /n/ in the coda of the first syllable to the surface form /m/.
lān-hu̍t (𡳞核) - testes; used in a similar way as the above examples.

Very VULGAR 
kha-chhng (尻川) - buttocks or anus
kha-chhng khang (尻川孔) - anus; arsehole
phah chhíu-chhèng (拍手銃)- literally 'to fire a hand-gun'; slang for male masturbation
bôa (磨)- literally 'to rub' or 'to grind'. Slang for 'having sex', the imagery being two bodies rubbing against each other.
tēⁿ (捏)- literally 'to squeeze' or 'to lie on something'. Slang for 'fuck'. Expression:
"lí hō͘ lâng tēⁿ" (汝予人捏) - you let yourself get (squeezed).
sè (勢) - literally 'to whack'. Slang for 'fuck'. Expression:
"lí hō͘ lâng sè" (汝予人勢) (you let yourself get fucked).
siáu (痟) - crazy.
kā (咬) - literally 'to bite'; slang for fellatio. Expression:
"lí khàm goá lān-chiáu" (汝崁我𡳞鳥) (suck my cock), used in anger as in "up yours!"
khàm (崁)- literally 'to cover'; slang for fellatio. Expression:
"khàm lān" (崁𡳞) (stupid cock).
chhīu-ni/chhiū-leng (樹奶) - literally 'rubber'; slang for condom
khàu-pē khàu-bú (哭爸哭母) - literally 'cry father cry mother', refers to annoying and noisy complaining.

List of Hokkien profanities

References

Sexual slang
Profanity by language
P